"Sweater Weather" is a song by American alternative band the Neighbourhood. The song was written by group members Jesse Rutherford, Zach Abels and Jeremy Freedman, and was produced by Justyn Pilbrow. It serves as the lead single from their debut studio album, I Love You (2013). "Sweater Weather" reached number one on the Billboard Alternative Songs chart in June 2013, logging eleven non-consecutive weeks at the summit of the chart. Pentatonix covered the song for their 2018 album Christmas Is Here! with an accompanying music video. The song was also covered by Kurt Hugo Schneider, Alyson Stoner, and Max S in 2014. In mid-to-late 2020, the song experienced a resurgence in popularity due to it being used on the social media platform TikTok. The song gained over 5 million on-demand streams on Spotify within the month of November 2020. As of January 5, 2022, the song is ranked in the top 100 of the most streamed songs on Spotify.

Background and writing
Zach Abels recalled to Radio.com: "One day Jesse was at my house and I was playing guitar. And he said, 'Hey that's pretty cool, let me record that.' And it just so happened to be "Sweater Weather." When we got done writing the song, when it was all said and done we were like 'Okay this is pretty good we should keep writing songs.'"

"I think 'Sweater Weather' might've been the best song we'd ever written," Rutherford added, "but I didn't think it was going to be the best song we'd ever write. It was kind of like getting a Platinum record, like a little tap on the butt."

Music video
There are two music videos for "Sweater Weather". The original video was released on March 28, 2012, but was later set as unlisted. The second music video for "Sweater Weather" was directed by Zack Sekuler and Daniel Iglesias Jr., shot in grayscale to go with their black-and-white theme, released on March 5, 2013.

Influence
Social media platforms regularly use the song's title or listening to the song as a shorthand for bisexuality, also citing it as a "bisexual anthem". Unpublished Zine says that the song is made a bisexual anthem due to its intimacy, the lyric's relative gender neutrality, the narrator's wearing of "bisexual" clothes, and the melodic similarity of the song to other songs popular on Tumblr when it came out—a time, reportedly, when many users were starting to express their bisexuality.

Charts

Weekly charts

Year-end charts

Certifications

See also
 List of Billboard number-one alternative singles of the 2010s

References

External links
 

The Neighbourhood songs
2012 songs
2012 singles
Columbia Records singles
Black-and-white music videos
Bisexuality-related songs